is a Japanese writer and novelist. He was the head writer of the anime series Serial Experiments Lain, Digimon Tamers, and Hellsing, as well as the television drama Ultraman Gaia.

Personal life
Konaka gave himself the middle initial "J", evoking the Christian name "John", due to him being born to parents who were members of the Anglican Church, but he does not identify as Christian. He began using the middle initial at the age of 12, when he began making 8 mm films; he patterned the style after Western names such as Charles M. Schulz.

Artistry and themes

Konaka's serious works generally have a dark, psychological tone. As a Cthulhu Mythos writer, he tends to add Lovecraftian elements to his works. He has cited Ghost Hound as his favorite screenwriting project.

The story-line of the early episodes of Digimon Tamers was based on one of the original scripts by Chiaki and Kazuya Konaka for Gamera: Guardian of the Universe in 1995 before the final draft by Kazunori Itō. Konaka brothers' plot was later used for Digimon Tamers and Gamera the Brave in 2006.

Controversy

In 2021, Konaka wrote a stage drama for Digimon Tamers''' 20th anniversary that was performed at DigiFes 2021, an official Digimon event held annually on August 1. The drama featured the cast of the show being confronted by a physical manifestation of "political correctness" that uses "cancel culture" as an attack. This brought attention to his blog meant for retrospective commentary on Digimon Tamers, in which he also discussed conspiracy theories, and sparked international controversy among Internet Digimon circles. In response, Konaka posted a statement in English addressed to his overseas fans on August 8, 2021, to explain his circumstances and to apologize for triggering a divide among the fandom.

 List of works 

 Anime Air Gear: Series composition, scriptArmitage III: Screenplay
Astro Boy (2003): ScriptThe Big O: Screenplay, scriptBirdy the Mighty: ScreenplayBubblegum Crisis Tokyo 2040: ScreenplayCatnapped!: ScreenplayDespera: ScriptDevil Lady: Script (episodes 1–5, 8, 12, 18, 25–26), series compositionDigimon Adventure 02: Scenario (episode 13)Digimon Tamers: Series composition, script (episodes 1–3, 7, 13–14, 23–24, 34–35, 41, 44–45, 49–51)Futari Ecchi: ScriptGasaraki: ScriptGeGeGe no Kitarō (1996): Script (Episode 89 only)Ghost Hound: Series composition, screenplayGR: Giant Robo: Series compositionHellsing: Series composition, script (episodes 1–6, 8–9, 11–13)Magic User's Club: Script (eps 2–6), novelization (1,2,5,6)Malice@Doll: Script, original storyParasite Dolls: ScriptPrincess Tutu: Script (4, 9, 22, 23)RahXephon: Screenplay (episodes 11–12, 17–18, 24–25)RahXephon: Pluralitas Concentio: ScreenplaySerial Experiments Lain: Miniseries composition, scriptShadow Star: Series composition, script (eps 1–3, 12–13)Texhnolyze: Series composition, script, scenario (episodes 1–4, 6, 12, 20–22)Vampire Princess Miyu: Script (ep 20)

Television dramasUltraman: Towards the Future Ultraman TigaUltraman GaiaUltra Q: Dark FantasyUltraman Max Cthulhu Mythos 
 Cthulhu's Strange Record Insumasu wo Oou Kage (a Japanese television adaptation of The Shadow Over Innsmouth)
 "Terror Rate", a short story included in Volume 2 of the Lairs of the Hidden Gods anthology

 Novel Marebito (also screenplay of 2004 feature film)

 Video games Serial Experiments LainKowloon's Curse''

References

External links 
 
 
 
 

1961 births
Anime screenwriters
Cthulhu Mythos writers
Japanese screenwriters
Japanese horror writers
Living people
Japanese former Christians
Japanese conspiracy theorists
Former Anglicans